Tashly-Yelga (Taşlıyılğa) is a rural locality (a village) in Nizhnesikiyazovsky Selsoviet, Baltachevsky District, Bashkortostan, Russia. The population was 105 as of 2010. There are 2 streets.

Geography 
Tashly-Yelga is located 14 km north of Starobaltachevo (the district's administrative centre) by road. Urta-Yelga is the nearest rural locality.

References 

Rural localities in Baltachevsky District